Tomdi District is a district of Navoiy Region in Uzbekistan. The capital lies at the town Tomdibuloq. The district consists of one urban-type settlements (Tomdibuloq) and 7 rural communities.

The city of Zarafshon is within the boundaries of Tomdi District, but is not part of it, instead being independent from it.

References

Navoiy Region
Districts of Uzbekistan